The Copa del Generalísimo 1939 Final was the 37th final of the King's Cup. The final was played at Montjuïc in Barcelona, on 25 June 1939, being won by Sevilla FC, who beat Racing Club de Ferrol 6-2.

Details

References

1939
Copa
Sevilla FC matches